Johan Ernesto Sánchez Morel (born 17 January 1989 in Jarabacoa) is a Dominican footballer who plays as a defender. He played at the 2014 FIFA World Cup qualifier

References

External links

1989 births
Living people
Association football defenders
Dominican Republic expatriate footballers
Dominican Republic expatriate sportspeople in the United States
Dominican Republic footballers
Dominican Republic international footballers
Expatriate soccer players in the United States
People from La Vega Province
Tyler Apaches men's soccer players